The Music Branch is a personnel branch of the Canadian Armed Forces (CAF). It is primarily composed of band musicians, and also deals with the selection and musical training of its recruits. The branch encompasses all the military bands in service in the Canadian Armed Forces. It is roughly the equivalent to the British Army's Royal Corps of Army Music (CAMUS).

It is composed of:

 15 Voluntary bands
 6 Regular Force bands
 53 Primary Reserve bands

The members of these bands come from all over the CF, coming from units in the Canadian Army, Royal Canadian Air Force, and Royal Canadian Navy. The branch controls all RCN and RCAF bands through the Naval Operations Branch and the Air Operations Branch respectively. The music branch as a whole is responsible for fostering morale in the CF and providing musical support for all aspects of military life and for official military ceremonies, including guards of honour for dignitaries.

Directorate of History and Heritage
The Directorate of History and Heritage is a sub-department of the Department of National Defence that is responsible to the Chief of Military Personnel (CMP) for providing personnel and technical advice regarding the Music Branch. It was founded on 1 September 1996 by merging the Canadian Forces Music Centre and the Directorate of Military Traditions and Heritage. On 1 April of the following year, the Music Centre was made part of the Directorate. The directorate has 7 sections, with the musical section making up DHH 7.

Its specific roles include:

Developing and managing Music Branch policy
Evaluating musician qualification level 
Provide advice and guidance on human resources including recommending the relocation of personnel and the recruitment for the Music Branch
Recommending the authorization of official music, marches and calls

The DHH Music Staff is the official leadership of the DHH and the Music Branch that formulates Music Branch policy and carries out its roles. The order of precedence is as follows:

Supervisor of Music
Music Branch Chief Warrant Officer
Music Branch Chief of Staff
CF Music Branch Standards Advisor
Pipes and Drums Advisor and Standards Master Warrant Officer
Brass and Reed Standards Master Warrant Officer
Music Branch Auditions Coordinator

Military Tattoos
The Music Branch handles all CF Military Tattoos around the country, including the Royal Nova Scotia International Tattoo, the Fortissimo Sunset Ceremony and the Canadian International Military Tattoo. The first tattoo to be managed by the branch was the Canadian Armed Forces Tattoo in 1967, which was the world's largest travelling show.

Traditions

March
The branch traditionally had no military marchpasts by virtue of military customs. Recently, it adopted Canada on the March by Lieutenant Colonel C. H. Jaeger as its march past.

Music Division
The Canadian Forces Logistics Training Centre Music Division is the training institution of the Music Branch that offers a curriculum of instruction to potential musicians in the CF. Part of the Royal Canadian Logistics Service, it is the de facto successor to the Canadian Forces School of Music. It is located in Building E-51 at CFB Borden. It consists of a concert hall, 47 practice studios, 10 teaching studios, a library, and four classrooms.

Supervisors of Music
Clifford Hunt (1964-1968)
Charles Villeneuve (1980-1984)
Commander George Morrison (1984-1990)
Lieutenant Colonel Gaétan Bouchard
Lieutenant Colonel W. Scott Attridge
Lieutenant Colonel Peter Chan (2017-2020)
Lieutenant Colonel Charles Gaudreau (2020–Present)

See also

 Canadian military bands
 Personnel branch
 Authorized marches of the Canadian Armed Forces
 Navy bands in Canada
 List of Royal Canadian Air Force Bands

Order of precedence

External links

Canadian Forces recruitment for musicians 
Join the Forces Music Branch 
Canadian Armed Forces 
The Department of National Defence Retrieved 19 February 2023

References

Canadian Armed Forces
Military history of Canada
Canadian Armed Forces personnel branches
Military bands of Canada